Matthew Thompson (born 18 August 1982) is a soccer player who plays for Lambton Jaffas of the National Premier Leagues.

Club career

Newcastle Jets
He scored a spectacular goal against Central Coast Mariners in Leg 2 of the 2005-06 semi-finals. He scored a similarly spectacular goal in Round 20 of the 2006–07 season against Adelaide United.

On 20 December 2008 he scored a hat trick, against Melbourne Victory at EnergyAustralia Stadium in their shock 4–2 upset victory.

Thompson was made captain of the Jets in the 2009-2010 due to a new Newcastle Jets policy that the player who has the most top-flight appearances for the club would receive the captain's armband.

Melbourne Heart

On 24 November 2009 he signed a contract with 2010-11 A-League expansion club, Melbourne Heart, becoming one of the club's first signings. Thompson is the record games holder for the A- league.

captained the club under Dutch international John Van Schip..

As a result of the Heart finishing second-to-last on the A-League ladder, their worst finish in an A-League season, Thompson, along with teammates Simon Colosimo, Clint Bolton and Fred, were released by the Heart at the conclusion of the 2012-13 A-League season.

Sydney FC
On 11 October 2013, he signed with Sydney FC as an injury replacement for Peter Triantis. He made his debut on the same day in Round 1 of the 2013–14 season against Newcastle Jets.

International career
Thompson made his first senior international debut for the Socceroos on 28 January 2009 in an AFC Asian Cup qualifying match versus Indonesia.

Honours
With Newcastle Jets:
 A-League Championship: 2007–08

References

External links
 Melbourne Heart profile 
 Oz Football profile

1982 births
Australian soccer players
Australia international soccer players
Macarthur Rams FC players
Parramatta Power players
Newcastle Jets FC players
Melbourne City FC players
Sydney FC players
Marconi Stallions FC players
Soccer players from Sydney
Living people
Expatriate footballers in Thailand
Association football midfielders
Association football central defenders